Just Dogs is a 1932 Silly Symphonies animated film, directed by Burt Gillett. It marked the first solo appearance of Pluto.

Plot
The film opens with a group of dogs in the dog pound, howling Vernon Dalhart's "The Prisoner's Song".

Pluto's cage-mate at the dog pound breaks out and lets all the other dogs out as well. In the park, the dog who helped Pluto earlier keeps following him too closely for Pluto's tastes, until he digs up a huge bone and gives it to Pluto (who doesn't particularly want to share). But soon all the other escaped dogs are chasing after the bone, so Pluto uses fleas and then shares it with the dog who helped him.

Voice cast
 Pluto: Pinto Colvig
 Puppy: unknown

Home media
The short was released on December 4, 2001, on Walt Disney Treasures: Silly Symphonies - The Historic Musical Animated Classics.

References

External links
 
 

1932 films
1932 short films
1930s Disney animated short films
Silly Symphonies
1932 animated films
Pluto (Disney) short films
Films directed by Burt Gillett
Films produced by Walt Disney
American black-and-white films
Animated films without speech
Films about dogs
1930s American films